Ralf Husmann (born 24 September 1964 in Dortmund) is a German TV producer, screenwriter and author. He is the creator of Stromberg, the German adaption of The Office.

Life and work
In the 1980s Ralf Husmann had a cabaret-Duo named Burghardt & Husmann with his partner Hubert Burghardt. Since 1995 he is an employee of the German television production company Brainpool, where he is a headwriter and television producer. He is responsible for diverse comedy- and show-productions. Amongst other things Ralf Husmann wrote for Die Harald Schmidt Show, the comedy series Anke, the television series Berlin, Berlin and the television show Rent a Pocher. Furthermore he works as author for the comedy show RTL Samstag Nacht or the television magazine . He also created the television series Dr. Psycho – Die Bösen, die Bullen, meine Frau und ich and had the main responsibility for it.

Since 2004 Ralf Husmanns public profile rose rapidly because of his work as author for the author comedy series Stromberg. He also appeared as associate Hans Schmelzer in a few episodes. In 2007 he became assistant director of Brainpool.

Furthermore Ralf Husman wrote two books. In June 2009 he released his novel Nicht mein Tag, which became a bestseller in Germany. In September 2010 appeared his second novel Vorsicht vor Leuten, also in Germany.

Filmography (selection)
1996: Die Harald Schmidt Show (writer, producer)
2000: Anke (writer, producer)
2003: Berlin, Berlin (one episode, writer)
2004–2012: Stromberg (writer, producer, actor)
2007–2008: Dr. Psycho – Die Bösen, die Bullen, meine Frau und ich (writer, producer, actor)
2009: Der kleine Mann (writer, producer)

Awards and nominations
Anke (2000)
2001: German Comedy Awards – Nomination for  Best Comedy Series
Rent a Pocher (2003)
2004: German Television Awards – Nomination for Best Comedy Program
2005: German Comedy Awards – Winner of the German Comedy Award for Best Comedy Program
Stromberg (2004–2010)
2005: German Television Awards – Nomination for Best Sitcom
2006: German Television Awards – Nomination for Best Sitcom
2006: Adolf Grimme Awards – Winner of the Adolf Grimme Award for Fiction/Entertainment – Series/Miniseries
2007: German Television Awards – Winner of the German Television Award for Best Sitcom
2007: German Television Awards – Winner of the German Television Award for Best Screenplay
Dr. Psycho – Die Bösen, die Bullen, meine Frau und ich (2007–2008)
2007: Adolf Grimme Awards – Winner of the Adolf Grimme Award for Entertainment
2007: German Television Awards – Winner of the German Television Award for Best Writing

References

External links
 

1964 births
Living people
Mass media people from North Rhine-Westphalia
People from Dortmund